is a Japanese science fiction horror manga series written and illustrated by Hitoshi Iwaaki. It was published in Kodansha's Morning Open Zōkan and Monthly Afternoon magazine from 1988 to 1995. The manga was published in North America first by Tokyopop, then Del Rey, and finally Kodansha USA. The series follows Shinichi Izumi, a high school senior who is the victim of a failed attempt by a parasyte organism to take over his brain. Instead of burrowing into his brain, the parasyte landed in his hand and matured partially up his arm.

The manga has been adapted into two live-action films in Japan, in 2014 and 2015. An anime television series adaptation by Madhouse, titled Parasyte -the maxim-, aired in Japan between October 2014 and March 2015. The English-language dub aired on Adult Swim's Toonami programming block in the United States between October 2015 and April 2016.

As of August 2022, the manga had over 25 million copies in circulation, making it one of the best-selling manga series of all time. In 1993, Parasyte received the 17th Kodansha Manga Award for the general category, as well as the 27th Seiun Award for the best manga in 1996.

Plot

Parasyte centers on a 17-year-old male high school student named Shinichi Izumi, who lives with his mother and father in a quiet neighborhood in Fukuyama, Hiroshima, Japan. One night, tiny worm-like aliens with drill-like heads called Parasites arrive on Earth, taking over the brains of their hosts by entering through their ears or noses. One Parasite attempts to crawl into Shinichi's nose while he sleeps, but fails as Shinichi wakes up, and enters his body by burrowing into his arm instead. In the Japanese version, it takes over his right hand and is named , after the Japanese word for 'right'.

Because Shinichi was able to prevent Migi from traveling further up into his brain, both beings retain their separate intellects and personalities. As the duo encounters other Parasites, they capitalize on their strange situation and gradually form a strong bond, working together to survive. This gives them an edge in battling other Parasites who frequently attack the pair upon realization that Shinichi's human brain is still intact. Shinichi feels compelled to fight other Parasites, who devour other members of the species they infect as food, while enlisting Migi's help.

The series explores philosophical and psychological questions such as the meaning of humanity, humans' relationship to the environment and other species, the role of instinct and love, and the inherent anthropocentrism of morality. Shinichi's experience with Migi causes him to question if humanity has any right to claim moral superiority to the Parasites, while Migi and Reiko Tamura's experiences with humans cause them to take on more human traits, such as love and sacrifice.

Development
Iwaaki chose a high school setting due to a scene he had thought of. When considering a scene where Migi turns his shape into a penis in front of Satomi Murano, Iwaaki believed that the scene would work best in a high school setting, so Iwaaki gave Parasyte a high school setting.

Media

Manga

Parasyte was originally serialized in Kodansha's Morning Open Zōkan from 1988 and switched to Monthly Afternoon after a few issues, where it ran from 1990 to 1995. Kodansha collected its chapters in ten tankōbon volumes, released from July 20, 1990, to March 15, 1995. It was later republished in eight kanzenban volumes from January 21 to June 21, 2003.

It was originally licensed for English translation and North American distribution by Tokyopop, which published the series over 12 volumes. The Tokyopop version ran in Mixxzine. Daily pages from the Tokyopop version ran in the Japanimation Station, a service accessible to users of America Online. The Tokyopop English-language manga went out of print on May 2, 2005. Del Rey Manga later acquired the rights to the series, and published eight volumes following the kanzenban release. Kodansha Comics later republished the volumes in North America between 2011 and 2012.

Tributes and spin-off
A tribute project titled , consisting of various one-shots written and illustrated by various manga artists, and based on the original manga to promote the then upcoming anime adaptation, began publishing on Monthly Afternoon on September 25, 2014. The list of collaborators includes Akira Hiramoto, Yukari Takinami, Yasushi Nirasawa, Hiroki Endo, Riichi Ueshiba, Ryōji Minagawa, Takatoshi Kumakura, Peach-Pit, Hiro Mashima, Moare Ohta, Takayuki Takeya and Moto Hagio. The stories were collected into a single volume, published by Kodansha on July 22, 2016. In North America, Kodansha USA published the volume on November 21, 2017.

Another tribute project, titled , began in Kodansha's Aria on September 27, 2014. The list of collaborators includes MikiMaki, Miki Rinno, Ema Tōyama, Hikaru Suruga, Asumiko Nakamura, Kaori Yuki, Yuri Narushima, Yui Kuroe, Renjuro Kindaichi, Banko Kuze, Kashio, Yūki Obata, Asia Watanabe, Lalako Kojima and Hajime Shinjō. Kodansha compiled the stories into two volumes, published digitally on April 24, 2015. Kodansha USA published the stories in a single volume, released on October 25, 2016.

A spin-off manga, titled , started on Kodansha's Comic Days app on March 2, 2018. It was written and illustrated by Moare Ohta. The series finished on May 7, 2021.

Anime

An anime television series adaptation titled  aired in Japan on Nippon TV between October 9, 2014, and March 26, 2015. It was produced by Madhouse, Nippon Television, VAP and Forecast Communications and directed by Kenichi Shimizu, with Shōji Yonemura handling series composition, Tadashi Hiramatsu designing the characters and Ken Arai composing the music. The opening theme song is "Let Me Hear" performed by Fear, and loathing in Las Vegas. The ending theme is "It's the Right Time" performed by Daichi Miura. At Anime Expo 2015, Sentai Filmworks announced that the anime would run on Adult Swim's Toonami programming block on October 4, 2015.

The series was simulcast by Crunchyroll outside of Asia and by Animax Asia in Southeast Asia and South Asia. Sentai Filmworks has licensed the anime for North America, South America, United Kingdom, Australia, and New Zealand release. UK Distributor Animatsu Entertainment released the series in the UK and Ireland. In Australia and New Zealand, Hanabee acquired the series and released it within the region. The English dub, provided and distributed by Sentai Filmworks, has been released on DVD and Blu-ray in two parts, with Part 1 (Episodes 1–12) on April 5, 2016, and Part 2 (Episodes 13–24) on July 5, 2016.

Live-action films
Hollywood's New Line Cinema had acquired the film rights to Parasyte in 2005, and a film adaptation was reported to be in the works, with Jim Henson Studios and Don Murphy allegedly in charge of production. New Line Cinema's option expired in 2013, prompting a bidding war in Japan. Film studio and distributor Toho won the rights, and decided to adapt the manga into a two-part live-action film series directed by Takashi Yamazaki. The first part, Parasyte: Part 1, was released in November 2014 and the second part, Parasyte: Part 2, was released in April 2015.

Korean series adaptation
In August 2022, Netflix announced a South Korean series adaptation, titled Parasyte: The Grey. It will be directed by Yeon Sang-ho with Jeon So-nee, Koo Kyo-hwan and Lee Jung-hyun in leading roles.

Reception
Parasyte won the 17th Kodansha Manga Award for the general category in 1993. It also won the 27th Seiun Award for being the best manga of the year in 1996. On TV Asahi's Manga Sōsenkyo 2021 poll, in which 150.000 people voted for their top 100 manga series, Parasyte ranked 60th.

By November 2013, the manga had over 11 million copies in circulation. By December 2020, the manga had more than 24 million copies in circulation;  it had over 25 million copies in circulation by August 2022.

The manga series has been praised and recommended by Waseda University professor and literary critic , and by philosopher Shunsuke Tsurumi. The manga artist Machiko Satonaka prised the work and described it as "a masterpiece that makes you think about fundamental problems that raises the awareness of identity establishment". Connie Zhang of Mania.com ranked the first volume of Parasyte as A−. Zhang wrote that the series' main focus is the dynamic relationship between Shinichi and Migi and their discussions about human nature. Zhang stated: "It is this casual philosophical pandering that makes Parasyte a cerebral manga. As the parasytes gradually adapt to human life and become cleverer at disguising their true identities, Shinichi finds himself in more and more danger". She concluded: "Parasyte is not just about a teenager saving the world. It is about a teenager at the cusp of adulthood and his cynical, mutinous right hand...saving the world. Highly recommended".

The anime adaptation by Madhouse was well received by critics and fans alike, getting praise for the animation, characterization, pacing and the soundtrack of the anime. In November 2019, Crunchyroll listed Parasyte -the maxim- in their "Top 100 best anime of the 2010s". IGN listed it among the best anime series of the 2010s. Lauren Orsini of Forbes included the series on her list of the best anime of the decade.

China ban
On June 12, 2015, the Chinese Ministry of Culture listed Parasyte among 38 anime and manga titles banned in mainland China. Nonetheless, the live-action version of Parasyte managed to be released in nationwide cinemas across mainland China, using a 125-minute special cut which condensed part 1 and part 2.

Notes

References

External links
 Official manga website at Afternoon 
 Official anime website 
 Official film website 
 

Parasyte
Body horror anime and manga
Del Rey Manga
Extraterrestrials in anime and manga
Fictional parasites and parasitoids
Horror anime and manga
Kodansha manga
Madhouse (company)
Manga adapted into films
Nippon TV original programming
Philosophical anime and manga
Science fiction anime and manga
Seinen manga
Sentai Filmworks
Television shows set in Hiroshima Prefecture
Tokyopop titles
Toonami
Thriller anime and manga
Winner of Kodansha Manga Award (General)
Works banned in China